Baripada is a Vidhan Sabha constituency of Mayurbhanj district, Odisha.

Area of this constituency includes Baripada, Baripada block, Khunta block and 9 GPs (Gudialbandh, Jadunathpur, Jarkani, Khanua, Naupal, Purnachandpur, Sankerko, Tangasol and Uthaninuagaon) of Badasahi block.

Elected Members

Fifteen elections held during 1951 to 2014. List of members elected from Baripada Vidhan Sabha constituency are:
2019: (33): Prakash Soren (BJP)
2014: (33): Sananda Marndi (BJD)
2009: (33): Sananda Marndi (BJD)
2004: (7): Bimal Lochan Das (JMM)
2000: (7): Kishore Das (JMM)
1995: (7): Prasanna Kumar Das (Congress)
1990: (7): Chhatish Chandra Dhal (Janata Dal)
1985: (7): Prasanna Kumar Das (Congress)
1980: (7): Prasanna Kumar Das (Congress)
1977: (7): Prasanna Kumar Das (Congress)
1974: (7): Pramod Chandra Bhanjadeo (Independent)
1971: (6): Pramod Chandra Bhanjadeo (Independent)
1967: (6): Santosh Kumar Sahu (Congress)
1961: (139): Santosh Kumar Sahu (Congress)
1957: (100): Harihar Mohanty (PSP) and Samal Majhi (Independent)
1951: (46): Girish Chandra Ray (PSP) and Surendra Singh (Congress)

2019 Election Result
In the 2019 election, Bharatiya Janata Party candidate Prakash Soren defeated Biju Janata Dal candidate Sarojini Hembram by a margin of 19,411 votes.

2014 Election Result
In 2014 election, Biju Janata Dal candidate Sananda Marndi defeated Bharatiya Janata Party candidate Nisamani Baske by a margin of 17,114 votes.

2009 Election Result
In 2009 election Biju Janata Dal candidate Sananda Marndi, defeated Jharkhand Mukti Morcha candidate Bhadav Hansdah by a margin of 4,760 votes.

Notes

References

Politics of Mayurbhanj district
Assembly constituencies of Odisha